The stile Umbertino is the name commonly given to a 19th-century style of Renaissance Revival architecture in Italy. It is a style which is typical of the eclecticism of late 19th century architecture and decorative arts in Europe. It is characterized by its eclecticism, because of the mix of decorative elements from the past.

It flourished during the reign of king Umberto I of Italy, after whom it was named, and it was most popular in Rome.

The name

The stile Umbertino takes its name from king Umberto I, who reigned the Kingdom of Italy from 1878 until his assassination in 1900. The term is also not reserved exclusively for architecture, but can also describe furniture of the period and other decorative arts.

History 
The stile Umbertino can be best described as the Italian declination of the Eclecticism, a style of architecture and decorative arts which swept across Europe in the second half of the 19th century, and that combines in one building features from different artistic periods and repertoires.

While Italian buildings and other artistic expressions in this style follow in many ways the path followed elsewhere in Europe, it also differs insofar it strives to formulate a truly national Italian style. This happened largely in the decades immediately following the Italian unification, as one of the many attempts to build a national sense of unity. In view of this, the style came to be applied often on buildings housing governmental bodies, such as ministries and law courts, as well as on palaces and villas for the establishment, especially in Rome, which became in 1870 the new capital of the Kingdom. Here the city council and the government developed an ambitious and grand plan to redevelop the city and endow it with infrastructures fit for its status of capital. The stile Umbertino gained in popularity after 1870 and dwindled around 1895. However, it remained in use for governmental buildings well into the first and second decade of the 20th century.

Characteristics 

Similarly to other declinations of the 19th century Eclecticism, the stile Umbertino draws inspiration from several periods of the history of art. It distinguishes itself for its particularly conservative interpretation of the Eclecticism, aiming to develop a truly national style. This latter came to be identified in an academic and conventional Renaissance Revival repertoire, with elements drawn as well from the Baroque period and the early Renaissance.

Notable examples 
Due to the rapid growth of population in late 19th century Italy, as well as the need of the new national government to make its mark in the cities of the new kingdom, examples of stile Umbertino can be found in all of Italy's major cities. Rome, in particular, boasts several architectural ensembles built in this style, being particularly favoured for governmental infrastructures.

Notable Umberto I style buildings:
Piazza della Repubblica, Florence (1870)
Galleria Vittorio Emanuele II, Milan (1878)
Palazzo delle Esposizioni, Rome (1883)
Palace of Justice, Rome (1885)
Palazzo Margherita, Rome (1886)
Porticoes of Piazza della Repubblica, Rome (1887)
Palazzo Koch, Rome (1888)
Galleria Umberto I, Naples (1890)
Palazzo del Viminale, Rome (1911)

Gallery

References

Architecture in Italy